Åsmund or Aasmund is a Norse male given name, derived from as ('god') and mundr ('protector'). People with the given name Åsmund or Aasmund include:

Asmund, Varangian tutor of Sviatoslav I of Kiev (945–972)
Åsmund Asdal (born 1957), Norwegian biologist
Aasmund Bjørkan (born 1973), retired Norwegian football midfielder
Aasmund Brynildsen (1917–1974), Norwegian essayist, biographer, editor and consultant
Roald Åsmund Bye (born 1928), Norwegian politician for the Labour Party
Åsmund Esval (born 1889), Norwegian painter
Åsmund Forfang (born 1952), Norwegian writer
Åsmund Frægdegjevar, medieval Norwegian legendary hero who is hired by the king to rescue a princess
Åsmund Kåresson, runemaster who flourished during the first half of the 11th century in Uppland, Sweden
Aasmund Kulien (1893–1988), Norwegian politician for the Labour Party
Aasmund Nordstoga (born 1964), Norwegian musician, singer and composer from Vinje, Telemark
Aasmund Olavsson Vinje (1818–1870), Norwegian poet and journalist
Åsmund Reikvam (born 1944), Norwegian professor in medicine and former politician
Aasmund Halvorsen Vinje (1851–1917), Norwegian politician for the Liberal Party splinter party Liberale Venstre

See also
Asmund, eponymous hero of the saga Ásmundar saga kappabana
Åsmund Åmli Band, Norwegian country/rock band from Valle in Setesdalen, formed in 1996
Åsmund Frægdegjevar (album), the first full-length album by the Norwegian folk metal band Lumsk

References 

Norwegian masculine given names